Hans Pischner (20 February 1914 – 15 October 2016) was a German harpsichordist, musicologist, opera director, and politician active in the German Democratic Republic. He encouraged the creation of musical and artistic cultural institutions in East Germany, and used his position in the SED to prevent any further brain drain of artists and musicians after the Berlin Wall was constructed by encouraging and supporting the arts. He served as Chairman of the Kulturbund from 1977 until German reunification in 1990.

Awards and honours
 Patriotic Order of Merit in Gold (1973)
 National Prize of the German Democratic Republic (1976)
 Star of People's Friendship in Gold (1979)
 Order of Karl Marx (1989)
 Order of Merit of the Federal Republic of Germany (1999)

References

German harpsichordists
Socialist Unity Party of Germany members
1914 births
2016 deaths
German centenarians
Men centenarians
Musicians from Wrocław
Recipients of the Cross of the Order of Merit of the Federal Republic of Germany
20th-century classical musicians